Xyrichtys martinicensis, the rosy razorfish, is a species of marine ray-finned fish from the family Labridae, the wrasses. Found in the Western Atlantic Ocean.  

Etymology
The fish is named in honor of the island of Martinique, FWI.

References

martinicensis
Taxa named by Achille Valenciennes
Fish described in 1840